Muhammad Akmal Cheema is the District Nazim of Sialkot District in the Punjab province of Pakistan. He was elected as District Nazim in 2005; previously, he was Nazim of Sialkot Tehsil.

An industrialist by profession, he belongs to Pakistan Muslim League (Q) and also to Cheema Jat clan.

References

Living people
People from Sialkot
Year of birth missing (living people)
Place of birth missing (living people)
Pakistan Muslim League (Q) politicians
Politicians from Sialkot